Luciana Masante (born 4 December 1978) is an Argentine former professional tennis player.

Masante began competing on tour in 1995 and featured mostly on the ITF Circuit, during her career. Her best performance on the WTA Tour was a second round appearance at the 1999 Croatian Bol Ladies Open, where she was eliminated by eventual champion Corina Morariu, retiring hurt with a leg injury while behind a set and 0–3.

Ranked as high as 197 in singles, Masante appeared in the qualifying draw for the 1999 US Open. 

On the ITF Circuit, she won six singles titles and eight doubles titles, before retiring from professional tennis in 2001.

ITF Circuit finals

Singles: 9 (6–3)

Doubles: 20 (8–12)

References

External links
 
 

1978 births
Living people
Argentine female tennis players
20th-century Argentine women
21st-century Argentine women